Deleastartus (Dalay-‘Ashtart) was a king of Tyre and the second of four brothers who held the kingship. The information about him has been inferred from Frank M. Cross’s reconstruction of Josephus’s citation of the Phoenician author Menander of Ephesus, in Against Apion i.18. In the text as it now stands for the passage in Josephus/Menander, Astartus is the name and Deleastartus the patronymic of the second of the four brothers to receive the kingship, while the first brother, the one who killed Abdastartus to start the dynasty, is unnamed. Cross restores Astartus as the name of the first brother and posits the supposed patronymic as the name of the second. For a further explanation, see the Astarymus article. Cross’s reconstruction for these kings has been followed by William Barnes and is used in the present article.

See also
List of Kings of Tyre
Astarymus
Pygmalion of Tyre

References

Kings of Tyre
9th-century BC rulers
943 BC births
880s BC deaths
9th-century BC Phoenician people